is a Japanese actor and politician. He has appeared in more than 50 films since 1964. His younger brother Katsuyuki Nakamura is a writer.

Career
Nakamura first joined the Haiyuza theatre troupe in 1962, and became famous for his starring role in the television jidaigeki series Kogarashi Monjirō, which began broadcasting in 1972. He later hosted several television news programs before becoming elected to the House of Councillors in 1998. He lost his seat in the 2004 election.

Selected filmography

Films

TV

References

External links
  (in Japanese)
 

 

People from Tokyo
Japanese male film actors
Japanese male television actors
Members of the House of Councillors (Japan)
1940 births
Living people
Japanese actor-politicians